USS Munda (CVE-104) was the last of fifty United States Navy  built for service during World War II. She was named after the Battle of Munda Point, which occurred on the island New Georgia, a part of the Solomon Islands in 1943. The ship was launched in May 1944, and commissioned in July, and served as an aircraft transport and as a replenishment escort carrier in the Pacific Theatre. Postwar, she participated in Operation Magic Carpet, the repatriation of U.S. forces from bases scattered around the Pacific. She was decommissioned in April 1946, when she was mothballed in the Pacific Reserve Fleet. Ultimately, she was sold for scrapping in June 1960.

Design and description

Munda was a Casablanca-class escort carrier, the most numerous type of aircraft carriers ever built, and designed specifically to be mass-produced using prefabricated sections, in order to replace heavy early war losses. She displaced  standard,  with a full load. She was powered with two Uniflow reciprocating steam engines, which drove two shafts, providing , thus enabling her to make . Her compact size necessitated the installation of an aircraft catapult at her bow, and there were two aircraft elevators to facilitate movement of aircraft between the flight and hangar deck: one each fore and aft.

One /38 caliber dual-purpose gun was mounted on the stern. Anti-aircraft defense was provided by eight  Bofors anti-aircraft guns in single mounts, as well as twelve  Oerlikon cannons, which were mounted around the perimeter of the deck. By the end of the war, Casablanca-class carriers had been modified to carry thirty 20 mm cannons, and the amount of 40 mm guns had been doubled to sixteen, by putting them into twin mounts. These modifications were in response to increasing casualties due to kamikaze attacks. Casablanca-class escort carriers were designed to carry 27 aircraft, but the hangar deck could accommodate more.

Construction
She was laid down on 29 March 1944, under a Maritime Commission contract, MC hull 1141, by the Kaiser Shipbuilding Company, Vancouver, Washington. The vessel was originally designated ACV-104, but was redesignated CVE-104 on 15 July 1943. She was initially named after Tonowek Bay, located within Prince of Wales Island, Alaska, 23 September 1943, and renamed Munda on 6 November 1943, in honor of the Battle of Munda Point, in the Solomon Islands, which was fought in July and August of that year. Munda was launched on 27 May 1944, sponsored by Mrs. James E. Dyer, to be accepted and commissioned on 8 July 1944, under the command of Captain L. A. Pope.

Service history

World War II

Upon being commissioned, Munda underwent a shakedown cruise down the West Coast. She was then assigned to Carrier Transport Squadron Pacific, which shuttled aircraft and crew to bases in the West Pacific. On 16 August, she departed the West Coast, carrying 71 aircraft and 251 military passengers. She steamed for the island of Espiritu Santo, in the New Hebrides, arriving on 1 September. She then stopped at Finschhafen and Manus Island, both part of the Territory of New Guinea, before heading back to the West Coast. She proceeded to Alameda, California, where she made a brief layover. She then made another transport run, arriving back on 5 December, before making a third run on 12 December. She made three more runs until mid-1945, for six transport missions in total. During one of these runs, Captain Welton Dana Rowley took over command of the vessel on 13 May 1945. On 3 July, she sailed for Eniwetok, of the Marshall Islands, where she was assigned to become a replenishment escort carrier, supporting the Third Fleet's frontline Fast Carrier Task Force as part of Task Group 30.8, the Fleet Oiler and Transport Carrier Group. Replenishment escort carriers such as Munda enabled the frontline carriers to replace battle losses, and to stay at sea for longer durations.

Munda met Task Group 30.8 on 20 July, and began to provide aircraft to replace losses sustained in raids against the Japanese home islands. The replenishment escort carrier fleet would meet with the Fast Carrier Task Force on designated rendezvous days, during which supplies, munitions, and aircraft would be transferred. During this time, she was anchored off Guam, where she received aircraft, munitions, and other supplies. She stopped at Guam on 26 July, before rejoining her task group on 3 August. She met with, and resupplied the Third Fleet on 3 August, 7 August, and 11 August. She departed her formation on 13 August, to head back to Guam and was en route, when the Japanese surrender was announced. After rejoining her task group, she supported the landings of Allied forces in the occupation of Japan, remaining on station through the first week of the occupation. On 10 September, she steamed into Tokyo Bay, shortly after the signing of the official surrender document.

Munda departed Tokyo Bay on 2 October, whereupon she joined the Operation Magic Carpet fleet, which repatriated U.S. servicemen from around the Pacific. She took part in several Magic Carpet runs until 1946, when she was released from the fleet. She proceeded to Port Angeles, Washington, arriving on 18 January 1946. There, inactivation work was conducted, and she was subsequently decommissioned on 13 September, and mothballed as part of the Pacific Reserve Fleet. She was redesignated as a utility aircraft carrier, CVU-104, on 12 June 1955. She was transferred to Bremerton, Washington on 29 April 1958. There, she was struck from the Navy list on 1 September, and sold for scrapping on 17 June 1960 to General Ore Co., New York. She was ultimately broken up in Japan throughout October 1960. She received one battle star for her World War II service.

References

Sources

Online sources

Bibliography

External links
 Photo gallery at navsource.org

Casablanca-class escort carriers
World War II escort aircraft carriers of the United States
Ships built in Vancouver, Washington
1944 ships
Pacific Reserve Fleet, Bremerton Group
S4-S2-BB3 ships